Warminster is a town in Wiltshire, England.

Warminster may also refer to:

Places
 Warminster, Virginia, United States, an unincorporated community
 Warminster Township, Bucks County, Pennsylvania, United States
 Warminster, a community in the township of Oro-Medonte, Ontario, Canada

Other
 Warminster School, Warminster, England, a co-educational independent day and boarding school
 Warminster railway station, Warminster, England
 Warminster station (SEPTA), in the Pennsylvania township
 Warminster Line, a commuter rail route between the SEPTA station and Philadelphia, Pennsylvania